The Order of India may refer to:

Order of the Star of India (1861-1947)
Order of the Indian Empire (1878-1947)
Order of the Crown of India (1878-1947)
Order of British India (1837-1947)

British India 
Orders, decorations, and medals of British India 
Military awards and decorations of the United Kingdom